Dim Sum Funeral is a 2008 comedy/drama film directed by Anna Chi and starring Kelly Hu, Bai Ling, Russell Wong, Steph Song and Talia Shire.

Premise 
After their mother dies, four Chinese-American siblings return to their Seattle home. As their mother wanted a traditional seven-day funeral, the estranged siblings stay the week and deal with their issues.

Cast 
Xiao family

Others

Reception
Dim Sum Funeral was widely panned by critics. Fionnuala Halligan of Screen Daily noted the film's "uneven tone", but she commended the set design and decoration by James Willcock.

See also 
 List of LGBT films directed by women

References

External links

2008 LGBT-related films
2008 films
American LGBT-related films
Canadian LGBT-related films
Films about Chinese Americans
Films about Chinese Canadians
Lesbian-related films
LGBT-related films about Chinese Americans
Films set in Seattle
Films about funerals
Chinese-language American films
2000s American films
2000s Canadian films